Bright may refer to:

Common meanings
Bright, an adjective meaning giving off or reflecting illumination; see Brightness
Bright, an adjective meaning someone with intelligence

People
Bright (surname)
Bright (given name)
Bright, the stage name of Thai actor/musician Vachirawit Chiva-aree

Places

Australia
 Bright, Victoria, a town
 Electoral district of Bright in South Australia

Canada
 Bright Parish, New Brunswick

Northern Ireland
Bright, County Down, a village and parish in County Down

United States
Bright, Indiana, a census-designated place
Bright, West Virginia, an unincorporated community
Bright, Wisconsin, an unincorporated community

Arts and entertainment

Music
Bright (American band), an experimental pop group from Brooklyn, New York 
Bright (Bright (American band) album), 1996 album
Bright (Japanese band), a dance vocal band from Japan
Bright (Bright (Japanese band) album), 2012 album
"Bright" (song), a song by Echosmith
Brighten, a 2021 album by Jerry Cantrell

Other media
Bright (film), a 2017 fantasy film starring Will Smith
Bright Noa, a fictional character from the Gundam anime metaverse
Bright (Suikoden), a character from the Genso Suikoden series of games

Businesses
Bright (company), a platform distributing digital art
Bright.com, an online job matching tool acquired by LinkedIn
Bright Automotive, American manufacturer of electric vehicles
More Radio Mid-Sussex, formerly Bright FM, a local radio station in Sussex, UK

Technology
BRIGHT (nanosatellite), the BRIght-star Target Explorer
Gradient Bright, a Czech paraglider design

Other uses
, a Hansa A Type cargo ship bearing this name 1967-69

See also
Bright's disease, historical classification of kidney diseases
Brights movement, encouraging rejection of the supernatural
Guangming (disambiguation), Guangming means bright(ness) in Chinese 
Brightness (disambiguation)